Luis Cruz Azaceta (born April 5, 1942) is a Cuban American painter.

Azateca has been active in painting and drawing since the late 1970s.  In usually large-format works executed with highly expressive colors, Cruz Azaceta has dealt with themes of urban violence, the type of personal isolation that comes with living in a large and overcrowded city, the hellish conditions created by mismanaged government, the abuses and oppression of dictatorships, and in a number of works done in the late 1980s, the ravages of AIDS.

Early life and work 
Luis Cruz Azaceta was born in Havana, Cuba. As a teenager, he witnessed many acts of violence on the streets of Havana: bombs in stores, cinemas and theaters, shoot-outs, arrests, and torture of citizens by Batista secret police.  In 1959, the Cuban revolution brought jubilation and celebration when Castro promised to restore Cuba's constitution and free elections. Months later executions began, businesses were confiscated and some closed. Azaceta's experiences under both Batista and post-revolution impacted his vision—creating a sensitivity towards violence, human cruelty, injustice, and alienation—which later become central themes in his work.

At 18 years old, Azaceta left Cuba for New York City.  Drawing and painting became the means for expressing himself and creating an identity in the big metropolis of the city. In 1969, he graduated from the School of Visual Arts in Manhattan.  After graduation, he developed series of works addressing the human condition.  In 1975, he had his first solo show at the Allan Frumkin Gallery on 57th Street, exhibiting works from the Subway Series. In the mid-1970s, at the beginning of his career, Azaceta tended to fill his compositions with numerous cartoony images and figures which were boldly colored and clearly outlined.  Many of the paintings articulate a shallow cramped space. Azaceta underscores his vision of the urban dweller as a threatened figure, someone who is constantly being pushed, pulled, and squeezed by both the environment and other people.

While Azaceta's "apocalyptic pop" style characterized his initial entry into the art world, he soon felt a need to move on.  It could be said that Azaceta's need to change is not only one of the features that distinguishes him from other painters, whether figurative or abstract, but it is also emblematic of his life as both an exile and an alien.  He lives in the Diaspora and knows that home is something he carries with him that there is no final and permanent refuge.

By the 1980s, his cramped compositions shift to a centralized, nude figure (often self-portrait) that dominates the composition. The mood and color are somber and the figure is often distorted.

Luis Cruz Azaceta is one of the great expressionists. In the neo-expressionist boom of the 80s, he was who revived "the historic role of expressionism as a social and moral force", as Rachel Weiss said. Azaceta is the great urban chronicler, the painter of contemporary Babylons with their landscapes of violence, drugs, crime, plagues, and fires.  It is not strange that the great critical painting of New York City as paradigm of a metropolis has been carried out by an immigrant of the Third World.

Later life and work 
In the early 1990s his work incorporated figuration and abstraction, perhaps extending from some of the works of the Aids Epidemic Series where abstraction is present as an ominous abyss. He returns to the subject of Balseros and Exiles using fields of circles and grids to generate a piercing dialog with the figure.  In 1992 he moves with his wife and two sons from New York to New Orleans where a warehouse studio provides him space for producing larger scale works, constructions and installations.  He begins shooting photographs of the New Orleans environment which become attachments in paintings.  A new materiality enters the work: twisted metal studs, nails, wood, board, plastic barricade fencing and weathered sheet metal.  Ironically the new found materiality and subject of exile connect in his installation, SWEPT AWAY, 2008 presented at Prospect 1. New Orleans Biennial from his Post Katrina series. Numerous series follow, some of which include the Museum Plans, Shifting States, Shootings in Sandy Hook and the Boston Bombing.

With Museum Plans, Luis Cruz Azaceta once again demonstrates an enviable ability to analyze culture and society. ...He now has the sensitivity to see the pitfalls and difficult aspects of the individuals and institutions who govern culture, and he is able to brilliantly express them in those labyrinths of lines devoid of exits.

The series Shifting States (2011-2012) is dedicated to the shocks that we have witnessed in recent years: Economies crumble, revolutions, wars, civil movements against social injustice, sudden climatic changes. The title of the series has a double meaning, referring to a time of major changes that we witness and the psychological state (the shifting state) which involves a state of self-awareness that leads to the necessary transformation.

In his most recent series, Azaceta is delivered to one of the most pressing issues in American society today: mass shootings and domestic terrorism.  His series of Sandy Hook and the Boston Bombing are paradigmatic in this regard. 

Azaceta's work has been featured in more than 100 solo exhibitions in the U.S., Europe and Latin America.  Currently his work can be seen at the Whitney Museum of American Art, New York, in the exhibition entitled, " I, YOU, WE", curated by David Kiehl, and at the Smithsonian American Art Museum, Washington, D.C., in the exhibition entitled, OUR AMERICA: THE LATINO PRESENCE IN AMERICAN ART, curated by E. Carmen Ramos.

In his critically acclaimed 2013  solo exhibition Dictators, Terrorism, War and Exiles at Aljira, Center for Contemporary Art, curator, Alejandro Anreus writes that Luis Cruz Azaceta is committed "to bearing witness to the political crisis of humanity. His work reflects how he identifies with isolation and oppression and speaks to both the horror and determination that is a part of the journey towards survival and freedom."

He has received numerous awards and grants, including the National Endowment for the Arts, The Guggenheim Memorial Foundation Grant, The Joan Mitchell Foundation Grant, Pollock/Krasner Grant, Penny McCall, New York Foundation for the Arts, Mid-Atlantic Grant for Special Projects and the Cintas Foundation.

His work can be seen in numerous museum collections, some of which include: The Museum of Modern Art, NY, The Metropolitan Museum of Art, NY, The Whitney Museum of American Art, NY, the Smithsonian American Art Museum, Washington, D.C., Museum of Fine Arts, Boston, the Delaware Art Museum, Museo De Arte Moderno, Santo Domingo, Dominican Republic, Museo De Bellas Artes, Caracas, Venezuela, Atrium Museo De Arte Contemporaneo, Victoria Gasteoz, Spain Kendall Art Center, Miami, Florida and Museo De Arte Contemporaneo De Monterrey, Mexico.

References

External links 

 Artist's website

Living people
1942 births
21st-century Cuban painters
Painters from Louisiana
20th-century Cuban painters
20th-century Cuban male artists
20th-century American male artists
American male painters
21st-century American painters
21st-century Cuban male artists
21st-century American male artists
20th-century American painters
People from Havana
School of Visual Arts alumni
Cuban emigrants to the United States
Male painters